Korea Tungsten Company (KTC, Korean: 대한중석, pronounced daehan jungsuk, Hanja: 大韓重石) was a major South Korean manufacturer of tungsten cutting tools, tungsten powder, and related metal-cutting products. It was the 28th-largest chaebol by asset with subsidiaries such as Korea Tungsten Construction and Korea Sintered Metal. With the national government, KTC also established POSCO, which is now the world's second largest steelmaker by output. In 1998, Keo-Pyung, then KTC's proprietor, defaulted on its loans and was declared bankrupt by its main creditor, CHB Bank. On May 12, 1998, Keo-Pyung announced that it would shed 14 of its 19 companies, Korea Tungsten among them. ISCAR, the predecessor and now the largest arm of IMC, bought KTC after months of negotiations, and renamed it TaeguTec. Today, TaeguTec group has become a global tooling and solutions giant with 25 overseas subsidiaries and over 130 distributors in 50 countries throughout the world.

History
The history of KTC dates back to April 1916, when the Sangdong Tungsten Mine was discovered in Gangwon Province, South Korea. Ever since, the company had grown to be one of the most successful and influential companies in Korea, accounting for 60 per cent of the country's total export revenue in the 60s and 70s.

Before 1960s
Apr. 1916: Outcrop of Sang-dong mine discovered in Gangwon Province, South Korea
Feb. 1936: Established SOLIM Mining Co. Ltd.
Feb. 1947: Export Scheelite to the USA for the first time
Sep. 1952: Established Korea Tungsten Co. Ltd. (State Enterprise)
Export: US$16,457,000 (56% of Korean Total)
Employing: 4,287
May. 1959: Constructed Chemical processing plant

1960s
Jun. 1961: Established New York City Branch office
Sep. 1961: Established R&D center
Nov. 1961: Established London Branch office
Feb. 1963: Established Tokyo Branch office
Nov. 1966: Won official commendation from government for export
Ranked second among Korean companies
Nov. 1967: Won official commendation from government for export
Ranked third among Korean companies
Feb. 1968: Established POSCO with the National Government (Government 75%, Korea Tungsten Co. Ltd 25%)
Nov. 1968: Won official commendation from government for export
Nov. 1969: Won official commendation from government for export

1970s
Nov. 1972: Constructed of APT (Ammonium Para Tungstate) plant
Feb. 1974: Constructed Tungsten Metal Powder and Tungsten Carbide Powder plant
Nov. 1976: Established Rotterdam Branch office
Nov. 1977: Constructed Cemented carbide plant
Products: Blank, Carbide insert, Mining tools, Brazed tools
Oct. 1978: Constructed Coating plant (CVD-TiN production firstly)
Dec. 1979: Constructed Tool holder plant

1980s
Jan. 1981: Developed Special Coating Substrate
May 1983: Rotterdam Branch office in Netherlands moved to Germany
Jul. 1985: Common R&D cooperation between Korea Tungsten Co. Ltd. and POSCO
Oct. 1985: Developed CERMET Inserts
Nov. 1988: Constructed Carbide Roll plant
Nov. 1989: Constructed Tungsten Wire plant

1990s
Mar. 1991: Constructed Ceramic plant
Feb. 1994: Sang-Dong Tungsten mine closed
Mar. 1994: Privatized and taken over by Keo-Pyung Group in Korea
May. 1995: Established Tungsten Wire plant in China
Aug. 1998: Korea Tungsten Co. Ltd. bought out by Iscar
Aug. 1998: Company name changed from Korea Tungsten Co. Ltd to TaeguTec Ltd.

Post-merger / TaeguTec era
Feb. 1999: Headquarters moved to Daegu from Seoul
Apr. 1999: Constructed new Marketing Center
1999: Established TaeguTec USA (The present Ingersoll USA - Rockford)
1999: Established TaeguTec Germany (The present Ingersoll GMBH - Haiger)
Mar. 2000: Established TaeguTec cutting tools factory in India
Jul. 2000: Constructed new R&D Center
Dec. 2000: Established TaeguTec China in Shanghai
Mar. 2001: Established TaeguTec Brazil in Sao Paulo
Jun. 2001: Established TaeguTec Scandinavia in Copenhagen, Denmark
Jun. 2002: Established TaeguTec UK in Leeds
Jun. 2002: Established TaeguTec Italy in Turin & Milan
Jun. 2004: Established TaeguTec Japan in Nagoya
Jun. 2004: Constructed new Tech Center and Carbide Rod factory
Jun. 2005: Established TaeguTec Australia in Sydney
Oct. 2005: Established TaeguTec Turkey in Istanbul
Mar. 2006: Established TaeguTec Slovakia in Žilina
Apr. 2006: Established TaeguTec Malaysia in Kuala Lumpur
Jan. 2007: Established TaeguTec Thailand in Bangkok
Feb. 2007: Established TaeguTec Spain in Barcelona
Mar. 2007: Established TaeguTec France in Champs-sur-Marne
Jul. 2007: Established TaeguTec Indonesia in Bekasi
Nov. 2007: Established TaeguTec Poland in Wroclaw
Apr. 2008: Established TaeguTec Russia in Moscow
Apr. 2008: Established TaeguTec Ukraine in Dnipro
Jun. 2009: Established TaeguTec South Africa in Johannesburg
Sep. 2009: Established TaeguTec Czech in Pilsen
Nov. 2009: Established TaeguTec Hungary in Törökbálint

See also

TaeguTec
Economy of South Korea
IMC
Government of South Korea
POSCO Group

References

External links
TaeguTec official website

Manufacturing companies established in 1916
South Korean brands
Chaebol
Companies disestablished in 1998
Defunct manufacturing companies of South Korea
Manufacturing companies based in Seoul